Malaysia Theological Seminary ( or STM) is an interdenominational Protestant seminary in the city of Seremban, Negeri Sembilan, Malaysia. Established in 1979, STM is accredited by the Association for Theological Education in South East Asia (ATESEA) and a participating school of the South East Asia Graduate School of Theology (SEAGST) from which the Master of Theology degree is awarded.

History 

STM started as a joint-venture among the Anglican Diocese of West Malaysia, the Methodists and the Evangelical Lutheran Church of Malaysia and Singapore (ELCMS) in Malaysia and was opened on 6 January 1979 (Feast of Epiphany). Its stated aim in the Companies Act of Malaysia under which it was incorporated was "to provide education in the Christian faith for the service in the ministry, worship and witness of the Church." This venture built upon a 1974 collaboration between the Anglicans and the Evangelical Lutherans that saw the merger of the Christian Training Centre (founded by the Lutherans in 1969) and the St. Mark's Training Centre (founded by the Anglicans in 1970) that was called Kolej Theologi Malaysia (KTM) or Malaysia Theological College (in English).

Since then, other Christian denominations have joined STM's governing council and participated in the development of the seminary, including the Anglican Diocese of Sabah, the Presbyterians and the Lutherans (LCMS).

Before STM's relocation to its current premises in 1998, it had been operating from rented premises in the following locations:
St.Mark's Anglican Church, Seremban, Negeri Sembilan, 1970-1979
 Zion Cathedral(ELCMS), Brickfields, Kuala Lumpur, 1979–1983
 Methodist High School, Sentul, Kuala Lumpur, 1983–1990
 Xavier's Hall (Roman Catholic), Petaling Jaya, 1990–1998

Organisation 

STM is governed by a council that is elected biennially. The founding members include the late Bishop C.N. Fang (Methodist), the late Bishop E.B. Muthusami (ELCM) and the late Bishop Tan Sri J.G. Savarimuthu (Anglican).

Principals 
 Rev. Datuk Dr. Denis C. Dutton: 1979–1986
 Rev. Dr. Hwa Yung: 1986–2001
 Rev. Dr. Ezra Kok: 2001–March 2015
 Rev. Dr. Philip Siew: April 2015 – March 2021
 Dr. Chong Siaw Fung: April 2021 – Present

Academic programmes 

STM offers both residential and extension academic programmes (through their Theological Education by Extension or TEE programme) leading to the awarding of the following qualifications:

Certificates and diplomas 
 Certificate of Christian Ministry (CertCM)
 Social Ministry (in co-operation with Malaysian CARE and the Bible College of Malaysia)
 Diploma of Christian Ministry (DipCM)

Undergraduate 
 Bachelor of Divinity (BD)
 Bachelor of Theology (Th.B.)

Postgraduate 
 Graduate Diploma of Christian Studies (GradDipCS)
 Master of Christian Studies (MCS)
 Master of Divinity (M.Div.)
 Master of Ministry (M.Min.)
 Master of Theology (Th.M.)
 Doctor of Ministry (D.Min.)

See also 
 Association for Theological Education in South East Asia

References

External links 
 STM Website

Seminaries and theological colleges in Malaysia
Protestantism in Malaysia